Strays is a 1991 American horror television film directed by John McPherson, written by Shaun Cassidy, and starring Kathleen Quinlan and Timothy Busfield. It aired on the USA Network on December 18, 1991.

Premise
Paul Jarrett is a lawyer from Chicago who moves into an isolated house with his wife Lindsey and his family. They soon find themselves being terrorized by a horde of stray cats.

Cast
 Timothy Busfield as Paul Jarrett
 Kathleen Quinlan as Lindsey Jarrett
 Claudia Christian as Claire Lederer
 William Boyett as Dr. Lyle Sokol
 Heather and Jessica Lilly as Tessa Jarrett

See also
 List of natural horror films

References

External links

1991 films
1991 television films
1991 horror films
1990s American films
1990s English-language films
American horror television films
American natural horror films
Films about cats
Films scored by Michel Colombier
USA Network original films